British climate may refer to:

Oceanic climate, a type of climate
Climate of the United Kingdom